Andreas Jung (born 13 May 1975) is a German lawyer and politician of the Christian Democratic Union (CDU) who has been serving as a member of the Bundestag from the state of Baden-Württemberg since 2005.

Since 2022, Jung has been one of five deputy chairs of the CDU, under the leadership of chairman Friedrich Merz.

Political career 
Jung first became a member of the Bundestag in the 2005 German federal election. From 2005 until 2013, he was a member of the Committee on the Environment, Nature Conservation and Nuclear Safety, where he served as his parliamentary group's rapporteur on climate protection. He also chaired the Parliamentary Advisory Board on Sustainable Development from 2009 until 2018.

In addition to his committee assignments, Jung has been chairing the German-French Parliamentary Friendship Group. Since March 2019, he has been serving as co-chair of the Franco-German Parliamentary Assembly.

In the negotiations to form a Grand Coalition of Chancellor Angela Merkel's Christian Democrats (CDU together with the Bavarian CSU) and the Social Democrats (SPD) following the 2013 federal elections, Jung was part of the CDU/CSU delegation in the working group on energy policy, led by Peter Altmaier and Hannelore Kraft. In the negotiations to form another coalition government under Merkel's leadership following the 2017 federal elections, he was part of the working group on energy, climate protection and the environment, led by Armin Laschet, Georg Nüßlein and Barbara Hendricks.

Since 2018, Jung has been serving as deputy chairman of the CDU/CSU parliamentary group, under the leadership of chairman Ralph Brinkhaus. In this capacity, he is the group's main spokesman for budgetary and financial issues.

Together with Roland Heintze, Daniel Günther, David McAllister, Nadine Schön, Antje Tillmann and Oliver Wittke, Jung co-chaired the CDU's 2018 national convention in Hamburg.

In the negotiations to form a coalition government under the leadership of Minister-President of Baden-Württemberg Winfried Kretschmann following the 2021 state elections, Jung co-chaired the working group on climate, environmental policy and energy, alongside Sandra Detzer.

Ahead of the 2021 elections, CDU chairman Armin Laschet included Jung in his eight-member shadow cabinet for the Christian Democrats’ campaign.

Other activities
 Energy and Climate Policy and Innovation Council (EPICO), Chair of the Advisory Board (since 2021)
 Jacques Delors Centre at Hertie School, Member of the advisory board (since 2019)
 Franco-German Institute (DFI), Member of the Board
 German Industry Initiative for Energy Efficiency (DENEFF), Member of the Parliamentary Advisory Board
 Bundesverband Bioenergie (BBE), Member of the advisory board (-2018)

Political positions
In June 2017, Jung voted against his parliamentary group's majority and in favor of Germany's introduction of same-sex marriage.

In April 2020, Jung co-signed – alongside around 50 other members of his parliamentary group – a letter to President of the European Commission Ursula von der Leyen which called on the European Union to take in children who were living in migrant camps across Greece.

Personal life
Jung lives on Reichenau Island, grew up in Stockach on Lake Constance. He is Catholic, married with two children.

References

External links 

  
 Bundestag biography 

1973 births
Living people
Members of the Bundestag for Baden-Württemberg
Members of the Bundestag 2021–2025
Members of the Bundestag 2017–2021
Members of the Bundestag 2013–2017
Members of the Bundestag 2009–2013
Members of the Bundestag 2005–2009
Members of the Bundestag for the Christian Democratic Union of Germany